Events in the year 1992 in Gabon.

Incumbents 

 President: Omar Bongo Ondimba
 Prime Minister: Casimir Oyé-Mba

Events 

 The country competed at the 1992 Summer Olympics in Barcelona, Spain.
 The African Forum for Reconstruction was founded.

Deaths

References 

 
1990s in Gabon
Years of the 20th century in Gabon
Chile